West Somerset District Council in Somerset, England was elected every four years. The first elections to the council were held in 1973, ahead of it coming into being in 1974. The last election was held in 2015. The council was abolished in 2019 when the district merged with neighbouring Taunton Deane district to become Somerset West and Taunton. West Somerset had 28 councillors following its final boundary changes in 2011, 28 elected from 16 wards.

Political control
From the first election to the council in 1973 until its abolition in 2019, political control of the council was held by the following parties:

Leadership
The leaders of the council from 1998 to 2019 were:

Council elections
Summary of the council composition after each council election, click on the year for full details of each election.

District result maps

By-elections
By-elections occur when seats become vacant between council elections. Below is a summary of recent by-elections; full by-election results can be found by clicking on the by-election name.

References

External links
West Somerset District Council

 
Council elections in Somerset